Rip the Jacker is the fifth studio album by American hip hop recording artist Canibus. Produced by Stoupe the Enemy of Mankind of the group Jedi Mind Tricks, the album was released on July 22, 2003, through Babygrande Records.

After the release of Canibus' album Mic Club: The Curriculum (2002), Babygrande CEO Chuck Wilson had Stoupe work on production for a follow-up to Mic Club. Canibus had recorded his lyrics to send to Stoupe before joining the United States Army and did not hear the final product until he bought a copy of the album. Taking its title from the character in the Mic Club track "Bis vs. Rip", Canibus characterizes Rip the Jacker as a concept album that sees the world through the eyes of a modern-day lyricist and poet. The album garnered acclaim from critics who praised the combination of Canibus' sharp lyricism with Stoupe's intricate production. Rip the Jacker reached number 194 on the Billboard 200, his first time on that chart since 2000 B.C. (2000). It also reached numbers 11 and 34 on the Independent Albums and Top R&B/Hip-Hop Albums charts respectively.

Conception 
After producer Stoupe the Enemy of Mankind of the group Jedi Mind Tricks produced the track "Liberal Arts" from Canibus' fourth album Mic Club: The Curriculum (2002), Babygrande Records CEO Chuck Wilson raised the possibility of Stoupe producing an album. Before enlisting in the United States Army, Canibus recorded his vocals before any production and then sent the a cappellas to Stoupe. Canibus claimed that he wrote the lyrics on a "stained dinner table in Hell's Kitchen". In 2003, he stated that the album consisted of his most complex rhymes to date and it "describes our civilization through the eyes of a modern day lyricist/poet". Due to his military obligations, he did not hear the songs in the final format until a week after the album's release when he purchased a copy at Best Buy. Although he released future albums, Rip the Jacker was intended to be his last. As a concept album, the record represents the third "personality" of the rapper: "Prof. Emeritus Rip The Jacker", the others being "Dr. PhD Canibus" and "Germaine Williams" (his real name). Canibus explained the alter-egos:

Music and reception 

Produced by Stoupe the Enemy of Mankind, the album frequently samples golden age hip hop tracks. Canibus is characterized for his "deep vocabulary, scientific concepts, battle rhymes and descriptive imagery" throughout the album. Stylus Magazines Kilian Murphy wrote that: 

The album received favorable reviews from music critics. AllMusic's Andy Kellman considered the album to have the "best set of productions Canibus has had to work with". C. Brown of AllHipHop wrote that Canibus provides "incredibly sharp lyricism" and "has adopted a more technical approach to his rhyming since the 1990s." HipHopDX called Rip the Jacker Canibus' best album and praised the "lyrical dexterity" which can be "matched by very few". Entertainment Weeklys Jonah Weiner described the rhymes as "high-flown and delivered with gruff scorn -- but inane". URB magazine writer Steve Juon of RapReviews.com ranked it the best album of 2003 and said it may be Canibus' "first album of perfection". Kilian Murphy of Stylus Magazine praised the record for its "pleasing level of instrumental detail and liquidity". Nathan Rabin of The A.V. Club wrote that Canibus "sounds like a kid who spends his free time reading the dictionary" and that the album was his "strongest, most consistent work to date. A shameless name-dropper, he references Noam Chomsky, Joseph Heller, Niels Bohr, and David Hume in his dense, challenging rhymes". Samuel Chesneau of The Stranger called it "easily his best album" which "incorporates a much different sound and a real gothic feel".

Track listing 
All songs written by Canibus and produced by Stoupe the Enemy of Mankind.

Singles

Charts

Personnel 
Information taken from AllMusic.
Executive producer – Louis Lombard III, Chuck Wilson
Design – Jeff Chenault
Mixing – Chris Conway
Photography – Stephen Mitchell Gilbert
Production coordination – Charles "Chase" Jones
Mastering – Emily Lazar, Sarah Register
Art direction – Luminati
Marketing – Jesse Stone
Vocal engineer – Todd Watson

References 

2003 albums
Babygrande Records albums
Canibus albums
Concept albums